Johnny Musso (born March 6, 1950) is an American former football player, a running back for three seasons with the BC Lions of the Canadian Football League and  in the National Football League with the Chicago Bears.

Early years
Born and raised in Birmingham, Alabama, Musso graduated from L. Frazier Banks High School in 1968, and played college football at the University of Alabama in Tuscaloosa under head coach Bear Bryant. He was an All-American in 1971 and led the Crimson Tide to an undefeated regular season and a berth in the Orange Bowl against top-ranked Nebraska.  He was nicknamed The Italian Stallion.

Musso was inducted into the Alabama Sports Hall of Fame in 1989, and the College Football Hall of Fame in 2000.

Professional career
Musso was a third round selection in the 1972 NFL draft, 62nd overall, by the Chicago Bears.

In March 1974, he was selected by the Birmingham Americans in the first round (7th overall) of the WFL Pro Draft.  After injuries and being moved to backup to all-star Lou Harris, Musso left the Lions in 1975 for Birmingham where he rushed for 681 yards.

After the WFL folded, he signed with the Bears in late November 1975, and was the backup to Walter Payton. Musso had surgery on his right knee in August 1978 and spent the season on injured reserve; he failed his physical in July 1979 and retired.

See also
 Alabama Crimson Tide football yearly statistical leaders

References

External links

 
 Alabama Sports Hall of Fame – Johnny Musso
 
WFL players – Johnny Musso

1950 births
Living people
Alabama Crimson Tide football players
All-American college football players
American football running backs
BC Lions players
Birmingham Vulcans players
Canadian football running backs
Chicago Bears players
College Football Hall of Fame inductees
Players of American football from Birmingham, Alabama